Suschania is a genus of flies belonging to the family Dolichopodidae. It contains one species, Suschania stackelbergi, described from Primorsky Krai in the Russian Far East.

References

Sympycninae
Dolichopodidae genera
Monotypic Diptera genera
Diptera of Asia
Insects of Russia
Fauna of the Russian Far East